Oscar Prati (1898 – 1971) was an Italian architect. His work was part of the architecture event in the art competition at the 1928 Summer Olympics.

References

1898 births
1971 deaths
20th-century Italian architects
Olympic competitors in art competitions
Place of birth missing